Benone is a popular tourist destination in the Causeway Coast and Glens district, County Londonderry, Northern Ireland.

Benone has several caravan sites, such as Golden Sands, Deighans' and a leisure complex with excellent facilities, including a 9-hole  golf course (all par 3) and numerous tennis courts. 

A short walk leads to Benone Strand, seven miles of beach and sand dunes on the north coast of Northern Ireland between Castlerock and the Magilligan peninsula, most of the distance between the mouth of the River Bann and Lough Foyle. It is one of the longest beaches in Northern Ireland, and recipient of the European Blue Flag and Seaside Award.

Railway access 
The Belfast-Derry railway line run by Northern Ireland Railways connects to Castlerock which is a walk over the Downhill Tunnels and Mussenden Temple to Downhill.  
Castlerock: trains connect Londonderry and Bellarena in the west and east to Coleraine and branch to Portush and onwards to Belfast Central and Belfast Great Victoria Street railway station.

References 

Limavady
Beaches of Northern Ireland
Geography of County Londonderry
Tourism in County Londonderry
Tourist attractions in County Londonderry
Causeway Coast and Glens district